Canobie Lake Park is an amusement park in Salem, New Hampshire, located about  north of Boston. It was founded as a trolley park on the shore of Canobie Lake in 1902. Three local families currently run the park, which draws visitors from throughout the New England and Mid-Atlantic regions. Canobie Lake Park's age and history inspired author Stephen King to use rides and elements from the park in his Joyland novel. It is one of only thirteen trolley parks still operating in the United States as of 2021.

The park originally featured botanical gardens, with few amusement rides. After the automobile became the most popular mode of travel in the United States, the trolley line serving the park was closed. Attendance in the park declined until it was purchased by Patrick J. Holland. He installed a wooden roller coaster named Yankee Cannonball in 1936, a ride which was designated as an ACE Roller Coaster Landmark by American Coaster Enthusiasts in 2013. The park recovered, and the Arrow Development designed Canobie Corkscrew was installed in 1987, after being relocated from the Old Chicago amusement park in Illinois, where it was named the Chicago Loop. Untamed, a Euro-Fighter coaster, is the only coaster with an inversion.

History

Canobie Lake Park opened on August 23, 1902, as a trolley park for the Massachusetts Northeast Street Railway Company. In its early years, the park was known for its flower gardens, promenades and gentle attractions. After the decline of trolley as a mode of travel, the park declined in popularity, culminating in the park's closure on St. Patrick's Day in 1929. In 1931, the park was auctioned off with the intent to subdivide the land into residential lots. Patrick J. Holland, a construction contractor from Ireland, bought the property for US$17,000. He and his workers restored the park with new gardens, attractions, and modern electricity. In 1932, the park reopened, three years after its initial closure. Its popularity recovered, and the Yankee Cannonball was installed, becoming one of the park's most popular attractions for decades. Holland died in 1943, leaving the park with his wife and son, who continued to own the park until 1958. The park is now currently owned by three families; they purchased the park in 1958, continued operating the park ever since, and still operate the park today.

Some films and novels have used Canobie Lake Park as a setting or filming location. Stephen King, an American author of horror novels, based the amusement park in his novel Joyland on Canobie Lake Park. A resident of the nearby state of Maine, King visited after searching for a park "that was nice and clean and sunlit, but wasn't too big". During a visit in 2012, King took photographs inside the dark ride attraction, "Mine of Lost Souls", because he wanted to incorporate a haunted dark ride into his novel. The park was also used as a filming location for the 2013 film Labor Day, based on the novel of the same name by Joyce Maynard. It also appeared in two live action children's TV shows on PBS Kids that were produced by PBS-affiliate WGBH Boston; it was featured in an episode of Fetch! with Ruff Ruffman, as well as in the season 6 opening intro to the show Zoom.

Rides and attractions

Canobie Lake Park features a variety of rides and attractions. The Yankee Cannonball, a 1930s-era wooden roller coaster, is one of the park's best-known rides. The park was home to a looping, steel roller coaster named the Canobie Corkscrew, designed by Arrow Dynamics. Originally manufactured in 1975, the Canobie Corkscrew operated at Old Chicago from 1975 to 1980 as the "Chicago Loop", at the Alabama State Fairgrounds as "Corkscrew" from 1982 to 1986, before moving to Canobie Lake in 1987. The Canobie Corkscrew was one of the first steel looping roller coasters manufactured in the world and was part of a series of Arrow corkscrew models produced from 1975 to 1979. It was removed in 2021.

Other thrill rides in Canobie Lake Park include Starblaster, an S&S Double Shot, which replaced a ride called the Moon Orbiter in 2002. The park also features a rotor ride named "Turkish Twist", and a shoot-the-chutes ride named "The Boston Tea Party". The park has one dark ride, "The Mine Of Lost Souls". Passengers board mine cars and venture into the depths of a haunted mine. Another flat ride at the park is the "Psychodrome", a scrambler ride located in a dome, with lighting, music and special effects. In 2005, the park opened Castaway Island, a small water park consisting of a water play structure. In October 2017, the park announced an expansion to the water ride complex, including a lazy river and a series of water slides.

The park once had a simulator ride named "USA Missile", built early in the Space Age by John Taggart and Sam Daugherty. Passengers sit facing the nose of the rocket, which is then inclined. A movie is shown on a screen at the front as a simulation of space flight. While at Canobie Lake Park, it was repainted to mimic the markings used on such launch vehicles as the Saturn rockets.

In 2011, the park added Untamed, a Gerstlauer Euro-Fighter 320+ model. This is the fourth Euro-Fighter to be added in the United States, the only one in the Northeast, and the first roller coaster to be opened in Canobie Lake Park since the Canobie Corkscrew in 1987. The following year, the park added Equinox, a ride that lifted and spun riders on a giant mechanical arm. Despite the ride's popularity, it was shut down in 2014 after persistent mechanical problems left the ride operating "sporadically". The park has stated that safety was not an issue.

Roller coasters

Thrill rides

Family rides

Water rides

Children's rides

Former rides

Roller coasters

Rides

Events
Canobie Lake Park holds many events in the park throughout the year, including live performances and fireworks shows. The park has multiple venues for live entertainment, including the Country Stage, Midway Stage, and Dancehall Theater. The park's Dancehall Theater has hosted performers such as Duke Ellington, Sonny & Cher, Frank Sinatra, and Ella Fitzgerald. The Canobie Ramblers occasionally perform at the Log Flume Gazebo. On certain weekends in September and October, Canobie Lake Park holds ScrEEEmfest, a Halloween event that they first did it in 2008. run in the afternoon that features Canobie's most popular rides plus five walk-through haunted attractions. Past "haunts" have included Merriment Incorporated, The Dead Shed, Black Hollow Cove, Head Hunters at Cannibal Lake, Cannibal Island, Demons of Darkness, and Virus. In 2020, due to COVID-19 restrictions, the park did not host Screeemfest for the first time since its inception. Instead, the park hosted a "food truck festival" within the closed for the season Castaway Island. This hosted trolley carts from around New England serving various foods and beverages to guests. The park hosts performances from impersonators of various celebrities, such as Michael Jackson and Tim McGraw. The Canobie Critters are the park's mascots. There have been several live shows starring the critters such as Critters Live: Surprise Party, Critters Live: Beach Bash, Critters Live: Halloween Show, the short-lived Critters Live: You're on Mute and the most recent and current Critter show, Critters Live: Dance Party.

Incidents
On July 27, 2001, five people riding the Yankee Cannonball roller coaster were injured when two of the ride's trains collided.
On July 1, 2014, a family of five attacked police officers after they were told they could not carry weapons in the park. Three of the family members were charged with felony riot.
On August 6, 2016, a stuntman rolled off of a safety net during Canobie Lake Park's "Rocket Man: The Human Cannonball" performance. The stuntman was unharmed, but was taken to an emergency room for an evaluation.

See also

List of amusement parks in New England

References

External links
 

Salem, New Hampshire
Amusement parks in New Hampshire
Water parks in New Hampshire
1902 establishments in New Hampshire
Buildings and structures in Rockingham County, New Hampshire
Tourist attractions in Rockingham County, New Hampshire